Chandragiri railway station (station code:CGI) is an Indian Railway station in Chandragiri, Tirupati located in Tirupati district of Andhra Pradesh. It is situated on Renigunta–Katpadi section and is administered by South Coast Railway zone.

See also 
List of railway stations in India

References 

Railway stations in Tirupati district
Transport in Tirupati